Mactrerpeton is an extinct genus of prehistoric amphibian.

See also
 List of prehistoric amphibians
 Prehistoric amphibian

Prehistoric amphibians